David  "Dai" Evans (28 January 1902 – 1951) was a professional footballer who played as a left half in the 1920s. He played for a number of teams in the English Football League, including Reading, Huddersfield Town and Bury.

He also won four caps for Wales, the first of which was against Ireland on 13 February 1926.

He was known as 'Dai Gethin' after the pub owned by his parents.

References

1902 births
1951 deaths
Welsh footballers
Wales international footballers
Footballers from Merthyr Tydfil
Association football wing halves
English Football League players
Merthyr Town F.C. players
Nelson F.C. players
Bolton Wanderers F.C. players
Reading F.C. players
Huddersfield Town A.F.C. players
Bury F.C. players